Kutak (also Romanized as Kūtak) is a village in Piveshk Rural District, Lirdaf District, Jask County, Hormozgan Province, Iran. At the 2006 census, its population was 147, in 34 families.

References 

Populated places in Jask County